Kirsty Gogan Alexander (born 11 July 1975 in Dublin) is an entrepreneur and environmentalist advocating for the use of all clean energy sources to address climate change. In 2021, Kirsty was appointed as a member of the IAEA Standing Advisory Group Nuclear Applications (SAGNA). She was awarded the Global Women In Nuclear Special Award For Work On Climate Change (2016), and Nuclear Industry Council Trailblazer Award (2019). She is a Fellow of the Royal Society of Arts, Manufacturing and Commerce. She has also been awarded Honorary Fellowships by the Energy Institute and the Nuclear Institute. Honorary Fellow is a category of membership that recognises those who:  “… the Board has decided merit special recognition by virtue of their position in the nuclear industry, their unique expertise or qualification, or in order to recognise their contribution to the industry in other ways.”

Career 
Kirsty and her business partner, Eric Ingersoll, co-founded and are managing directors of NGO TerraPraxis, (since 2020) and consultancy firm LucidCatalyst since 2016. She also founded and ran the climate and energy access-focused non-profit, Energy for Humanity (EfH) from 2014-2020. 
 
Kirsty is a member of the UK Government’s Nuclear Innovation Research and Advisory Board (NIRAB).
 
LucidCatalyst is a highly specialised international consultancy focused on large-scale, affordable, market-based decarbonisation of the global economy. In 2020, TerraPraxis and LucidCatalyst launched their flagship report Missing Link to a Livable Climate: How Hydrogen Enabled Synthetic Fuels can Help Deliver the Paris Goals.
 
Kirsty and Eric Ingersoll also co-founded and run TerraPraxis. Powered 100% by philanthropy, TerraPraxis is a nonprofit organisation that innovates and incubates scalable solutions for a liveable planet and human prosperity. Founded in September 2020, the first annual review is available here. 

Kirsty is frequently invited as a speaker and moderator at high profile events around the world, such as CERAWeek. and the Global Clean Energy Action Forum.

Works

Peer reviewed

Co-authored - Contributions

References

External links 

 Ep5: Kirsty Gogan 'Fighting for Nuclear' Cleaningup.live August. 19, 2020
 Ep 67: Kirsty Gogan - Environmental Activist, Energy for Humanity Titans of Nuclear, 4 September 2018
 Nuclear Future magazine (August 2021).

Living people
1975 births
Businesspeople from Dublin (city)
People associated with nuclear power
Climate activists
Irish company founders